Francis Browne (1880–1960), was an Irish photographer and Jesuit priest.

Francis or Frank Browne may also refer to:

Francis Browne (died 1541), Member of Parliament (MP) for Stamford
Francis Browne (MP for Bodmin) (fl. 1560s), MP for Bodmin
Francis Browne, 3rd Viscount Montagu (1610–1682)
Francis Browne, 4th Viscount Montagu (1638–1708), English peer
Francis Browne, 4th Baron Kilmaine (1843–1907), Anglo-Irish politician and landowner.
Francis Fisher Browne (1843–1913), American editor, poet, and critic
Francis Aubrey Browne (1878–1953), English-born accountant and political figure in British Columbia
Frank Browne (journalist) (1915–1981), Australian journalist
Francis Browne (cricketer) (1899–1970), English cricketer, schoolteacher and clergyman
Francis James Browne (1879–1963), professor of obstetrics and gynaecology
Francis Browne (priest, died 1797), Anglican priest in Ireland
Frank Styant Browne (1854–1938), Australian pharmacist, artist, photographer and X-ray pioneer

See also
Francis Brown (disambiguation)
Frank Brown (disambiguation)
Frances Browne (1816–1887), Irish poet and novelist
Franklin Browne (1873–1946), cricketer